Chakroun (Arabic شكرون) is an Arabic and French family name (surname) originating in Lebanon. It is the third most common surname in the South of Lebanon (Al Janub) and the most common surname in the towns of Irkay, Kfarrumman, Roumin, Bnaafoul, and Loubyeh.

Etymology and history
The name originally derives from Shukr (Arabic شكر ), an Arabic term denoting thankfulness, gratitude, or acknowledgment by humans. This surname was given in the early 18th century to a person who demonstrated all these qualities. Then after decades and decades, the name eventually evolved into Chakroun which is the name found today.

In the late 1800s, the 'Chakroun' family was mostly responsible for the uniting of most of the villages and towns in the South of Lebanon. This helped strengthen the relationships between the Muslims, Druze and the Christians, after the 1860 Druze–Maronite conflict had caused serious tensions between them. The 'Chakroun' family then started to settle in the South of Lebanon in the village of Irkay and then slowly moving to other villages such as: Kfarumman and Roumin.

Although this surname is mostly found in Lebanon, there are a lot of people in other countries who also share this surname. Some of these countries include: Tunisia, Iraq and Morocco.

Variations
Variations of the surname Chakroun also remain very common. These include different spellings of the English term and different pronunciations.

The Arabic term is very much the same, however the English term is sometimes spelled differently by changing the first letter or adding an 'a' after the 'k'. For example:
 Shakroun
 Chakaroun
 Shakaroun
 Chakroun
 Chekroun

Notable people sharing the surname "Chakroun"
 Alfred Schakron (1961–2012), a Belizean businessman of Lebanese origin

Notes

Sources
Chakroun, Nadim, Direct Interview, 6 July 2010.
Rist, John M. (1982). Human Value: A Study in Ancient Philosophical Ethics. BRILL. 

Arabic-language surnames